Avante Ramone Santana (né Brown; born March 24, 1998), known professionally as Tanna Leone, is an American rapper. In March 2022, he became the third artist signed to PGLang, the multidisciplinary creative collective founded by rapper Kendrick Lamar and filmmaker Dave Free, under the aegis of Def Jam Recordings. His debut studio album Sleepy Soldier, was released in April 2022.

Personal life 
Avante Ramone Brown was born on March 24, 1998, in Los Angeles. His mother is a spoken word artist, and has stated that he "might share some relatives" with fellow rapper Baby Keem. Brown moved around a lot growing up and experienced many different environments, which he believes has made him very adaptive and socially well-rounded.

Following in his mother's footsteps, Brown made his first song at age 11. He would continue to write songs for fun, and often performed them for friends at school. He would later join a poetry club that held cyphers, where he was able to refine his lyrical skills. His first performance in front of a crowd surprisingly felt "extremely natural," which opened him up to the idea of pursuing a professional career as an artist.

Artistry 
He lists 2Pac and DMX as his biggest influences. In his top five artists, he has himself, Kendrick, Frank Ocean, André 3000 and Missy Elliott. Describing his sound, Tanna says it has the strength of a rap song and the melody of an R&B or rock song. "It's not following any type of rule book or guideline. It's just something you could feel."

Discography

Albums

Extended plays

Guest appearances

Tours

Supporting
 Baby Keem - The Melodic Blue Tour (2021-2022)

 Kendrick Lamar - The Big Steppers Tour (2022)

References 

1998 births
Living people
African-American songwriters
African-American male rappers
West Coast hip hop musicians
Rappers from Los Angeles
Alternative hip hop musicians
Def Jam Recordings artists
PGLang artists
Songwriters from California